Raghib Ramadian "Rocket" Ismail (born November 18, 1969) is an American former American and Canadian football wide receiver and kick returner. He played college football at Notre Dame before moving on to both the Canadian Football League (CFL) from 1991–92 and the National Football League (NFL) from 1993–2001.

Ismail recorded two 1,000-yard receiving seasons in the NFL and was a CFL All-Star in 1991, as well as the Most Valuable Player of the 79th Grey Cup. In 2004, College Football News named Ismail the No. 75 player on its list of the Top 100 Greatest College Football Players of All-Time. He was also selected by Sports Illustrated to the 85-man roster of its all-20th Century college football team.

Early life and family
Ismail was born in Elizabeth, New Jersey and was raised in Wilkes-Barre, Pennsylvania. He attended Elmer L. Meyers Junior/Senior High School.

Football career

College
Ismail first came to prominence as a receiver for the University of Notre Dame. The Fighting Irish won the College Football National Championship in 1988, placed second in 1989 by winning the 1990 Orange Bowl against Colorado, and again went to the 1991 Orange Bowl, losing to Colorado 10–9. In that game, he returned a punt 91 yards for a touchdown that would have won the game for Notre Dame and stopped Colorado from winning a share of the National Championship; however, the play was called back on a clipping penalty sealing the Irish defeat. After the 1990 season, Ismail finished second in the voting for the Heisman Trophy as the top college football player, losing to Brigham Young University quarterback Ty Detmer.

During the 1989 regular season game against Michigan, Ismail returned two kickoffs for touchdowns. He was featured on the cover of Sports Illustrated twice, and received numerous awards, including All-American status.

The projected first overall selection in the 1991 NFL Draft, Ismail decided at the last minute to sign a record contract with the Toronto Argonauts of the Canadian Football League starting during their 1991 season. As a result, he was chosen by the Los Angeles Raiders with the 100th overall pick in the draft.

Track and field
Ismail was also a track star at the University of Notre Dame, where he ran the 100 meters in 10.2 seconds. He also competed in the 55 meters, with a personal best of 6.07 seconds. At the 1991 NCAA Indoor Track Championships, he finished 2nd in the 55-meter sprint.

Personal bests

Canadian Football League
After Bruce McNall purchased the Toronto Argonauts with hockey player Wayne Gretzky and actor John Candy, the Argonauts made Ismail a groundbreaking offer for a CFL player: $18.2 million over four years. The average value of his full contract, $4.55 million per season, was more than the anticipated 2006 CFL salary cap of $3.8 million per team. The CFL had a salary cap in place since 1991, but the rules contained an exemption for a "marquee player" who would not count against the cap. Doug Flutie of the BC Lions was about to be paid $1 million under the exemption, but Ismail's contract was more than anything North American football had ever seen, as his yearly salary was then the largest in Canadian or American football history. By comparison, the highest paid NFL player at the time was Joe Montana earning $3.25 million per year.

Ismail joined the Argonauts in time for the 1991 season, and in his first game, returned a kick seventy-three yards on a reverse with Michael Clemons. Ismail ended his rookie season at the 79th Grey Cup. He recorded an 87-yard touchdown on a kickoff return and was named the Grey Cup Most Valuable Player as his Argonauts defeated the Calgary Stampeders 36–21. He came within fifty yards of breaking his teammate Clemons' franchise record for single-season kickoff return yardage, and made the 1991 All-Star team as a wide receiver, finishing runner-up to Jon Volpe for rookie of the year.

In 1992 Ismail broke Clemons' franchise record for single-season kick return yards. Ismail was unhappy in Canada as the Argonauts slumped to a 6–12 record, missing the playoffs. He was also remembered for his participation in a sideline brawl against the Stampeders where he stomped an opposing player's helmeted face. He later apologized on Speaker's Corner. With the huge contract around Toronto's neck and McNall facing increasing financial trouble, Ismail left the CFL, and, after the season, signed with the Los Angeles Raiders.

National Football League

Los Angeles/Oakland Raiders
Ismail was going to be selected as the first overall pick in the 1991 NFL Draft by the Dallas Cowboys, until he decided to sign with the Toronto Argonauts. The Los Angeles Raiders selected him in the fourth round (100th overall), to own his rights in case he decided to return to the NFL.

In 1993, as a rookie in the National Football League, Ismail recorded 353 receiving yards. The next year, he recorded 513 receiving yards and five touchdowns. In 1995, the Raiders' first season back in Oakland, he recorded 491 yards receiving.

On August 25, 1996, after having three disappointing seasons, Ismail was traded to the Carolina Panthers for a fifth-round pick (#157-Nick Lopez).

Carolina Panthers
In 1996 the Panthers, under head coach Dom Capers, finished 12–4, but Ismail recorded a career-low 214 yards receiving, without a single touchdown. In 1997 he recorded 419 receiving yards and two touchdowns.

In 1998, he had a breakout year, registering 69 receptions for 1,024 yards and eight touchdowns, two yards short of doubling his previous career high.

Dallas Cowboys
On March 23, 1999, the Dallas Cowboys signed him as a free agent after outbidding other teams. After Michael Irvin suffered a career-ending injury in the fourth game of the season, Ismail became the team's leading wide receiver, recording a career-high 1,097 yards and six touchdowns.

In 2000, he missed the last six games after tearing the ACL in his right knee against the Philadelphia Eagles, during the tenth game of the season, finishing with only 350 receiving yards. In 2001, he missed two games after spraining the MCL in the same injured knee against the San Diego Chargers.

On August 31, 2002, he was placed on the injured reserve list after suffering a herniated disk in his neck, due to a collision with teammate Dat Nguyen during training camp. He was released on February 26, 2003, in a salary cap move. He later announced his retirement in March.

Post-football career

Media appearances
Ismail was a color analyst on ESPN's College GameDay in 2003 and 2004.

Ismail cohosted Cowboys Game Night on FSN Southwest with co-host Nate Newton and Ric Renner.

In February 2008, Ismail appeared as a Pro in the third season of Spike TV's Pros vs. Joes.

He was a contestant on Ty Murray’s Celebrity Bull Riding Challenge on CMT. In March 2010, it was announced that Ismail would be a correspondent on the show, interviewing contestants about their lives outside the competition.

Slamball coaching
In 2008, he coached the Bouncers in the extreme sports league Slamball.

Personal life
Ismail is married to Melanie Ismail and they have four children.

He is the older brother of former Syracuse University and NFL wide receiver Qadry Ismail, nicknamed "The Missile", and former University of Texas-El Paso and New York Dragons receiver Sulaiman Ismail, nicknamed "The Bomb". His father, Ibrahim, died when he was 10; his mother, Fatma, was sometimes referred to as "The Launch Pad" because of her sons' nicknames Rocket, Missile, and Bomb.

He converted from Islam in his early teens after his Muslim father died and he was sent to live with his grandmother, a member of an Assemblies of God church. Ismail has been described as a "devout Christian".

Ismail is now an inspirational speaker, and enjoys speaking for corporations, schools and churches.

As of the 2019 season, his son, Raghib "Rocket" Ismail Jr., plays for the University of Wyoming football team.

References

External links
 Player page at ESPN.com
 Official Notre Dame bio

1969 births
Living people
American football return specialists
American football wide receivers
Canadian football return specialists
Canadian football wide receivers
Carolina Panthers players
Dallas Cowboys players
Los Angeles Raiders players
Notre Dame Fighting Irish football players
Notre Dame Fighting Irish men's track and field athletes
Oakland Raiders players
Toronto Argonauts players
All-American college football players
Canadian Football League Rookie of the Year Award winners
Slamball
Sportspeople from Elizabeth, New Jersey
Sportspeople from Wilkes-Barre, Pennsylvania
Players of American football from Pennsylvania
African-American players of American football
African-American players of Canadian football
African-American Christians
American former Muslims
American Protestants
Converts to Protestantism from Islam
21st-century African-American people
20th-century African-American sportspeople